Harold Wightman (19 June 1894-5 April 1945) was an English football manager, who managed Luton Town, Mansfield Town and Nottingham Forest.

References

External links

Luton Town F.C. managers
Mansfield Town F.C. managers
Nottingham Forest F.C. managers
English football managers
1894 births
1945 deaths
Sportspeople from Sutton-in-Ashfield
Footballers from Nottinghamshire